Tim Burns may refer to:

Politicians
Timothy Burns (Wisconsin politician) (1820–1853), lieutenant governor of Wisconsin, 1851–1853
Timothy Burns (Louisiana politician) (born 1957), member of the Louisiana House of Representatives from St. Tammany Parish
Tim Burns (Michigan politician) (born 1973), Democratic Oakland County commissioner

Others
Tim Burns (businessman) (born 1968), Pennsylvania businessman 
Tim Burns (footballer) (born 1947), Canadian soccer player 
Tim Burns (writer), Canadian television writer and producer